A merchant ship, merchant vessel, trading vessel, or merchantman is a watercraft that transports cargo or carries passengers for hire. This is in contrast to pleasure craft, which are used for personal recreation, and naval ships, which are used for military purposes.

They come in myriad sizes and shapes, from  inflatable dive boats in Hawaii, to 5,000-passenger casino vessels on the Mississippi River, to tugboats plying New York Harbor, to  oil tankers and container ships at major ports, to passenger-carrying submarines in the Caribbean.

Many merchant ships operate under a "flag of convenience" from a country other than the home of the vessel's owners, such as Liberia and Panama, which have more favorable maritime laws than other countries.

The Greek merchant marine is the largest in the world. Today, the Greek fleet accounts for some 16 per cent of the world's tonnage; this makes it currently the largest single international merchant fleet in the world, albeit not the largest in history.

During wars, merchant ships may be used as auxiliaries to the navies of their respective countries, and are called upon to deliver military personnel and materiel.

History

Definitions
The term "commercial vessel" is defined by the United States Coast Guard as any vessel (i.e. boat or ship) engaged in commercial trade or that carries passengers for hire.

In English, the term "Merchant Navy" without further clarification is used to refer to the British Merchant Navy; the United States merchant fleet is known as the United States Merchant Marine.

Name prefixes 

Merchant ships' names have a prefix to indicate which kind of vessel they are:

 CS = Cable Ship/Cable layer
 LNG = Gas carrier transporting liquefied natural gas
 LPG = Gas carrier transporting liquefied petroleum gas
 MFV = Motor Fishing Vessel
 MS = Motorship
 MSV = Motor Stand-by Vessel
 MT = Motor Tanker or Motor Tug Boat
 MV = Motor/Merchant Vessel
 MY = Motor Yacht
NS = Nuclear Ship
 RMS = Royal Mail Ship
 RRS = Royal Research Ship
 RV = Research Vessel
 SS = Steam Ship
 SV = Sailing vessel/Sailing Vessel (although these can be sub coded as type of sailing vessel)

Merchant ship categories 

The UNCTAD review of maritime transport categorizes ships as: oil tankers, bulk (and combination) carriers, general cargo ships, container ships, and "other ships", which includes "liquefied petroleum gas carriers, liquefied natural gas carriers, parcel (chemical) tankers, specialized tankers, reefers, offshore supply, tugs, dredgers, cruise, ferries, other non-cargo". General cargo ships include "multi-purpose and project vessels and Roll-on/roll-off cargo".

Cargo ship

A cargo ship or freighter is any sort of ship or vessel that carries cargo, goods, and materials from one port to another. Thousands of cargo carriers ply the world's seas and oceans each year; they handle the bulk of international trade. Cargo ships are usually specially designed for the task, often being equipped with cranes and other mechanisms to load and unload, and come in all sizes.

Bulk carrier

A bulk carrier is a ship used to transport bulk cargo items such as iron ore, bauxite, coal, cement, grain and similar cargo. Bulk carriers can be recognized by large box-like hatches on deck, designed to slide outboard or fold fore-and-aft to enable access for loading or discharging cargo.  The dimensions of bulk carriers are often determined by the ports and sea routes that they need to serve, and by the maximum width of the Panama Canal.  Most lakes are too small to accommodate bulk carriers, but a large fleet of lake freighters has been plying the Great Lakes and St. Lawrence Seaway of North America for over a century.

Container ship

A container ship is a cargo ship that carries its cargo in standardized containers, in a technique called containerization. These ships are a common means of commercial intermodal freight transport.

Tanker

A tanker is a ship designed to transport liquids in bulk. Tankers can range in size from several hundred tons, designed to serve small harbours and coastal settlements, to several hundred thousand tons, with these being designed for long-range haulage. A wide range of products are carried by tankers, including:
 hydrocarbon products such as oil, LPG, and LNG
 chemicals, such as ammonia, chlorine, and styrene monomer
 fresh water
 wine

Different products require different handling and transport, thus special types of tankers have been built, such as chemical tankers, oil tankers, and gas carriers.

Among oil tankers, supertankers were designed for carrying oil around the Horn of Africa from the Middle East; the FSO Knock Nevis being the largest vessel in the world, a ULCC supertanker formerly known as Jahre Viking (Seawise Giant). The use of such large ships is in fact very unprofitable, due to the inability to operate them at full cargo capacity; hence, the production of supertankers has currently ceased. Today's largest oil tankers in comparison by gross tonnage are TI Europe, TI Asia, TI Oceania, which are the largest sailing vessels today. But even with their deadweight of 441,585 metric tons, sailing as VLCC most of the time, they do not use more than 70%  of their total capacity.

Apart from pipeline transport, tankers are the only method for transporting large quantities of oil, although such tankers have caused large environmental disasters when sinking close to coastal regions, causing oil spills.

Coastal trading vessel 

Coastal trading vessels are smaller ships that carry any category of cargo along coastal, rather than trans-oceanic, routes. Coasters are shallow-hulled ships used for trade between locations on the same island or continent. Their shallow hulls allow them to sail over reefs and other submerged navigation hazards, whereas ships designed for blue-water trade usually have much deeper hulls for better seakeeping.

Passenger ship

A passenger ship is a ship whose primary function is to carry passengers. The category does not include cargo vessels which have accommodations for limited numbers of passengers, such as the formerly ubiquitous twelve-passenger freighters in which the transport of passengers is secondary to the carriage of freight. The type does however include many classes of ships which are designed to transport substantial numbers of passengers as well as freight. Indeed, until recently virtually all ocean liners were able to transport mail, package freight and express, and other cargo in addition to passenger luggage, and were equipped with cargo holds and derricks, kingposts, or other cargo-handling gear for that purpose. Modern cruiseferries have car decks for lorries as well as the passengers' cars. Only in more recent ocean liners and in virtually all cruise ships has this cargo capacity been removed. A ferry is a boat or ship carrying passengers and sometimes their vehicles. Ferries are also used to transport freight (in lorries and sometimes unpowered freight containers) and even railroad cars (in the case of a train ferry).

See also 

American Bureau of Shipping
American Waterways Operators
Armed merchantman
Boat
Canal
Ferry
Freight transport
Gas carrier
Glossary of nautical terms
Great Lakes Waterway
Lake freighter
List of cargo types
Marine fuel management
Maritime transport
Navigability
Roll trailer
Saint Lawrence Seaway
Ship
Ship prefix
Train ferry
Tramp trade
Watercraft
Waterway
Whaleback

References

 
Merchant navy
Ship types
Maritime transport
Freight transport